Forager is a character appearing in American comic books published by DC Comics.

Publication history
The original Forager first appeared in New Gods #9 (August 1972) and was created by Jack Kirby. A female version of the character debuted in New Gods (Volume 3) #2 (March 1989).

Fictional character biography

Original Forager
Evolving from the "micro-life" spread on New Genesis during their war with Apokolips, Forager's people are a society of humanoid bugs that thrive in colonies beneath the surface of the planet. These colonies are ruled by beings known as the Queen-Widow and Prime-One. Considered to be below the New Gods of the floating city, Supertown (both literally and figuratively), the bugs form a lower class on New Genesis and are sometimes the target of prejudice by the gods.

Although Forager was raised among the insect nation, it is implied in New Gods #9 that he is in fact not of their species and may be from the race of gods. His true background is never fully explored. When the bug society is threatened, Forager is sent by his colony's rulers to entreat the gods for aid. With help from Orion and Lightray, he prevents Mantis from slaughtering the bug species.

Initially treated as subhuman by the New Gods, particularly the hot-headed Orion, Forager proves himself to be a worthy ally against the forces of Darkseid. He is killed saving Batman's life and preventing the destruction of Earth from the embodiment of the Anti-Life Equation in the limited series Cosmic Odyssey. Later Orion carries Forager's body to the Insect empire by the decree of Highfather, and slowly comes to respect the warrior and his people.

Female Forager

A second Forager, this one a female, appears as the new defender of the bugs in a subsequent New Gods series in 1989. She is given the name of her people's fallen champion by the Prime One and Queen Widow.

She appears again in Countdown #40 spying on Darkseid to find out about Lightray's death, and she later recruits Jimmy Olsen to help her stop the murders of the New Gods. They later enter into a romantic relationship. Over the course of the series, she and the other protagonists of Countdown are witness to the entire Death of the New Gods, the "Great Disaster" and the corruption of Mary Marvel. In its final issue, she ends her relationship with Jimmy and joins forces with Donna Troy, Atom and Kyle Rayner in a new Challengers from Beyond, declaring to the Monitors that they will be acting as Multiversal "border guards" in the future.

Young Animal
In 2017, DC Comics published a 6-issue limited series starring the original Forager titled Bug! the Adventures of Forager as part of its Young Animal imprint. The first issue launched May 10 of the same year.

Forager awakens in a cocoon and breaks out, only to seemingly find himself in a home basement on Earth. He recalls Metron saying he wasn't actually dead, but in a dormant state. Forager spots a teddy bear laying on a cupboard and hears it talk. A little "ghost girl" takes the bear and climbs the stairs. Forager follows the girl only to be confronted by monsters who keep referring to him as "the sleeper". He fends off the creatures and stumbles upon a room where the ghost girl is lining up dominoes in a pattern identical to that of a Mother Box circuitry grid, much to Forager's confusion.

The teddy bear asks Forager whether he will go back to New Genesis to rejoin either the New Gods or the Bugs. Forager says no; he has no intention of participating any further in High Father's war with Darkseid or going back to the Bugs just to "work 'til he dies". The teddy bear then asks Forager if he plans to go back to saving the universe, to which he also says no, he would much rather explore it. The bear then suggests that Forager is not truly "rebelling" due to his decisions being expected. Forager touches one of the dominoes, which causes him to experience a vision of various people. He then topples the dominoes, causing some kind of chain reaction. Frightened, Forager calls out to the ghost girl to make it stop, only to realize he is alone. Forager is then attacked by two more creatures, who he defeats easily.

He is then attacked by a costumed man. Once Forager inadvertently reveals himself as the sleeper, the man tells him that he intends to save him. The man introduces himself as Sandman and the two creatures as his helpers, Brute and Glob and tells Forager that it is their responsibility to police the Dreaming. Sandman also tells him that he is not in the real world, but a dream. He tries waking Forager by saying his name, but when that fails, he suggests saying his nickname, "Bug". It works and Forager reemerges from his cocoon in the waking world, and finds that his new acquaintances are there with him. The group is attacked by lizard-men, who they easily kill. Sandman reveals that he and his helpers can exist in the real world thanks to a whistle made of the reality warping metal, orichalcum. They then encounter the Nazi mad scientist, General Electric, who renders them unconscious with his own orichalcum whistle and takes Sandman's. Forager and his allies regain consciousness in a giant bottle within General Electric's lab. As Electric is gloating, Forager breaks the bottle open. He takes one of the whistles, and then accidentally steps into a seemingly random dimensional portal.

Powers and abilities
Forager retains the attributes of The New Gods, including superhuman strength, endurance, speed and reflexes. The Forager's incredible strength allows him to face much bigger enemies, jumping several meters high easily and running to great speed without fatigue. Forager is extremely long-lived and immune to diseases. Also, he is an accomplished fighter, hardened by the bugs' harsh life of hunting and survival. In addition to his natural abilities, Forager carries a variety of tools including a shield, adhesive pads on his gloves and boots that allow him to stick or climb walls and surfaces, and his signature weapon, acid-pods, which allow him to shoot streams of burning acid at his opponents.

In other media
 The original Forager appears in the Superman: The Animated Series episode "Apokolips...Now!".
 The original Forager appears in the Justice League two-part episode "Twilight", voiced by Corey Burton. This version is modest and reveres the Supertown Gods. While aiding Batman and Wonder Woman in stopping an attack on New Genesis carried out by Darkseid, Forager uses his hive to provide shelter for Supertown's inhabitants after the New Gods abandon them. Following this, Highfather promotes Forager to a higher rank.
 Forager appears in Young Justice, voiced by Jason Spisak. This version is a sentient anthropomorphic alien insect who possesses an extra set of arms, can roll up into a ball, and displays an odd connection to sentient technology. Additionally, despite being from New Genesis, he is not a New God and does not use pronouns due to his race's unique sense of self. Introduced in the third season, he contacts the Team to help stop a war between his kind and the New Gods, only to be banished from his hive by Mantis and earn the wrath of Ma'alefa'ak, the one who orchestrated the conflict. As it is no longer safe for him on New Genesis, the Team takes Forager with them to Earth, where he joins them in fighting the Light and takes on the human identity of Fred Bugg via a glamour charm to attend Happy Harbor High School. He later reveals his true identity to his classmates, to their enjoyment. As of the fourth season, Forager has become class valedictorian, graduated from Happy Harbor High, and enters a relationship with a female purple Forager (voiced by Nika Futterman) while attending a summit with Rocket and Jay Garrick. Having undergone training with Nightwing, Forager defeats Mantis in combat while the purple Forager becomes a Green Lantern after Tomar-Re is murdered by Lor-Zod.
 The original Forager makes a minor non-speaking appearance in the Harley Quinn episode "Inner (Para) Demons".

See also
 New Gods

External links
 DCU Guide: Forager I 
 DCU Guide: Forager II

References

DC Comics aliens
DC Comics characters who can move at superhuman speeds
DC Comics characters with superhuman strength
DC Comics deities
DC Comics demons
DC Comics extraterrestrial superheroes
DC Comics female superheroes
New Gods of New Genesis
Comics characters introduced in 1972
Comics characters introduced in 1989
Characters created by Jack Kirby